Dazu Huike (487–593) is considered the Second Patriarch of Chan Buddhism and the twenty-ninth since Gautama Buddha. He was the successor to Bodhidharma.

Biography

Sources
As with most of the early Chán patriarchs, very little firm data is available about his life. The earliest extant biography of the Chán patriarchs is the Biographies of Eminent Monks (519) and its sequel, Further Biographies of Eminent Monks (645) by Tao-hsuan (?-667). The following biography is the traditional Chan biography as handed down throughout the centuries, including the Denkoroku by Zen Master Keizan Jokin (1268–1325).

Life
The Hsu kao-seng chuan says that Huike was born in Hu-lao (Sishui, modern Xingyang, Henan) and his secular name was Shénguāng (神光, Wade–Giles: Shen-kuang; Japanese: Shinko). A scholar in both Buddhist scriptures and classical Chinese texts, including Taoism,  Huike was considered enlightened but criticised for not having a teacher. He met his teacher, Bodhidharma, at the Shaolin Monastery in 528 when he was about forty years old and studied with Bodhidharma for six years (some sources say four years, five years, or nine years).

Huike went to Yedu (Wade–Giles: Yeh-tu) (modern Henan) about 534  and, except for a period of political turmoil and Buddhist persecution in 574, lived in the area of Yedu and Wei (modern Hebei) for the rest of his life. It was during the time of upheaval that Huike sought refuge in the mountains near the Yangtze River and met Sengcan who was to become his successor and the Third Chinese Patriarch of Chan. In 579, Huike returned to Yedu and expounded the dharma, drawing large numbers to listen to his teachings and arousing the hostility of other Buddhist teachers, one of whom, Tao-heng, paid money to have Huike killed. However, Huike converted the would-be assassin. (ibid)

The Wudeng Huiyan (Compendium of Five Lamps), compiled by Dachuan Lingyin Puji (1179–1253), claims that Huike lived to the age of one-hundred seven.  He was buried about forty kilometres east northeast of  Anyang  City in Hebei Province. Later, the Tang Dynasty emperor, De Zong, gave Huike the honorific name Dazu ("Great Ancestor"). Some traditions have it that Huike was executed after complaints about his teachings by influential Buddhist priests. One story says that blood did not flow from his decapitated body, but rather, a white milky substance flowed through his neck.

Bodhidharma legends
Huike figures in several Bodhidharma-legends.

Cutting off his arm
Legend has it that Bodhidharma initially refused to teach Huike. Huike stood in the snow outside Bodhidharma's cave all night, until the snow reached his waist. In the morning, Bodhidharma asked him why he was there. Huike replied that he wanted a teacher to "open the gate of the elixir of universal compassion to liberate all beings".

Bodhidharma refused, saying, "How can you hope for true religion with little virtue, little wisdom, a shallow heart, and an arrogant mind? It would just be a waste of effort."

Finally, to prove his resolve,  Huike cut off his left arm and presented it to the First Patriarch as a token of his sincerity. Bodhidharma then accepted him as a student, and changed his name from Shenguang to Huike, which means, "Wisdom and Capacity".

Pacifying the mind
Huike said to Bodhidharma, "My mind is anxious. Please pacify it." 
Bodhidharma replied, "Bring me your mind, and I will pacify it."  
Huike said, "Although I've sought it, I cannot find it." 
"There," Bodhidharma replied, "I have pacified your mind."

Awakening
According to the Denkoroku, when Huike and Bodhidharma were climbing up Few Houses Peak, Bodhidharma asked, "Where are we going?" 
Huike replied, "Please go right ahead---that's it." 
Bodhidharma retorted, "If you go right ahead, you cannot move a step." 
Upon hearing these words, Huike was enlightened.

Transmission

Skin, flesh, bone, marrow
Legend has it that Bodhidharma wished to return to India and called together his disciples and the following exchange took place;

Bodhidharma passed on the symbolic robe and bowl of dharma succession to Huike and, some texts claim, a copy of the Lankavatara Sutra. Bodhidharma then either returned to India or died.

Teachings

Dhyana
There is little doubt that Huike practiced and promoted meditation (as opposed to sutra commentary) as the method to reach understanding of true Buddhism. Tao-hsuan referred to Huike (and others) as dhyana masters (Wade–Giles: ch'an-shih; Japanese: zenji), highlighting the importance of meditation practice in these early years of Chan development. However, what form Huike and Bodhidharma's meditation took (which Tao-hsuan labelled ju shih an-hsin wei pi-kuan (如是安心壁覯 "wall gazing" or "wall contemplation", lit "if so, peace of mind wall seeing") is unclear.

Sudden awakening
One of the most important characteristics of the early Chán of Bodhidharma and Huike was the sudden approach to enlightenment rather than the Indian yogic meditation which advocated concentration and gradual self-perfection.

Huike wrote:
Originally deluded, one calls the mani-pearl a potsherd
Suddenly one is awakened---and it is [recognized] as a pearl
Ignorance and wisdom are identical, not different.

Lankavatara Sutra
There is some evidence that both Huike and Bodhidharma based their teachings on the Lankavatara Sutra, although this cannot be firmly established by modern scholars. Tao-hsuan listed Huike and his circle of disciples as masters of meditation, and the Lankavatara Sutra, in his Further Biographies of Eminent Monks

This sutra urges ‘self-enlightenment', the "forgetting of words and thoughts".

Two Entrances
One text that was circulating at the time of Huike was the Treatise on the Two Entrances and Four Practices (Wade–Giles: Erh-ju ssu-hsing lun; Pinyin: Erru sixing lun). This text was the purported teachings of Bodhidharma with a preface by T'an Lin (fl. 525-543)

The "two entrances" refers to the entrance of principle and the entrance of practice. 
 The entrance of principle is that one must have faith in the truth of the teachings and that everyone possesses the same "true nature" which is covered up by "false senses". 
 The entrance of practice refers to the four practices of the title: be undisturbed by suffering, accept one's circumstances and be unmoved by good or bad fortune, be without attachment or desire and, finally, govern one's actions based on understanding the emptiness or non-substantiality of all things.

Buddha-nature
Attached to the text are some letters, one of which may have been written to Huike, and Huike's brief reply. The Bodhidharma text and Huike's letter indicate that the earliest teachings of what was to become Chan emphasized that Buddha Nature was within, and each person must realize this individually through meditation rather than studying the sutras, ceremonies, doing good deeds, or worshiping the Buddhas. Meditation should be free of any dualism or attached goal and realization occurs suddenly.

Notes

References

Sources
 Cleary, Thomas (1999) Transmission of Light: Zen in the Art of Enlightenment by Zen Master Keizan, North Point Press 
 Dumoulin, Heinrich (1994,1998) Zen Buddhism: a history, India and China, Macmillan Publishing, 
 Faure, Bernard, Bodhidharma as Textual and Religious Paradigm in History of Religions, Vol. 25, No. 3. (Feb., 1986)
 Ferguson, Andy (2000) Zen's Chinese Heritage: the masters and their teachings, Wisdom Publications, 
 McRae, John (1986) The Northern School and the Formation of Early Ch'an Buddhism, University of Hawaii Press, 
 The Shambhala Dictionary of Buddhism and Zen (1991) Shambhala, 
 Yampolsky, Philip (1999) Ch'an, a Historical Sketch in Buddhist Spirituality in Later China, Korea, Japan and the Modern World, Takeuchi Yoshinori (ed); SCM Press   p 5

External links
Faure, Bernard, Bodhidharma as Textual and Religious Paradigm in History of Religions, Vol. 25, No. 3. (Feb., 1986)

487 births
593 deaths
2
Buddhist martyrs
Executed people from Henan
Executed Sui dynasty people
5th-century Buddhist monks
6th-century Buddhist monks
Chinese Buddhist monks
Northern Wei Buddhists
Northern Qi Buddhists
Northern Zhou Buddhists
Sui dynasty Buddhists
Chinese centenarians
Men centenarians